HBS1 like translational GTPase is a protein that in humans is encoded by the HBS1L gene.

Function

This gene encodes a member of the GTP-binding elongation factor family. It is expressed in multiple tissues with the highest expression in heart and skeletal muscle. The intergenic region of this gene and the MYB gene has been identified to be a quantitative trait locus (QTL) controlling fetal hemoglobin level, and this region influences erythrocyte, platelet, and monocyte counts as well as erythrocyte volume and hemoglobin content. DNA polymorphisms at this region associate with fetal hemoglobin levels and pain crises in sickle cell disease. A single nucleotide polymorphism in exon 1 of this gene is significantly associated with severity in beta-thalassemia/Hemoglobin E. Multiple alternatively spliced transcript variants encoding different protein isoforms have been found for this gene.

References

Further reading